The Theban Tomb TT26 is located in El-Assasif, part of the Theban Necropolis, on the west bank of the Nile, opposite to Luxor. It is the burial place of the ancient Egyptian official, Khnumemhab.

Khnumemhab was an overseer of the treasury in the Ramesseum in the estate of Amun during the reign of Ramesses II.  His wife Meryesi (or Mery-Isis) is shown in the hall and inner room of the tomb.

See also
 List of Theban tombs

References

Buildings and structures completed in the 13th century BC
Theban tombs